Ravi Madasamy, better known as M Ravi, is a Singaporean human rights lawyer and activist. Known for his work as a cause lawyer, he has served as counsel in multiple high-profile court cases in Singapore, many of which have become leading cases in Singaporean constitutional law and Singapore's approach toward capital punishment and LGBT rights.

After graduating from the National University of Singapore and Cardiff University, Ravi qualified and practiced law in Singapore. He was defence counsel for death row inmates Yong Vui Kong, Gobi Avedian, and Cheong Chun Yin, all of whom had their death sentences separately commuted to jail terms (life imprisonment for Yong and Cheong, and 15 years' imprisonment for Gobi). Throughout his career, he launched lawsuits against the Singapore government on human rights issues, including the constitutionality of Section 377A, freedom of expression, and voting rights, many of which have led to judicial and political changes.

Ravi is an activist for death penalty abolition and LGBT rights. He ran for election during the 2015 general election as a member of the Reform Party in contesting Ang Mo Kio GRC but lost to the governing People's Action Party. For his advocacy and pro-bono work, Ravi has been recognised by international activists and NGOs including Richard Branson, Amnesty International, the International Bar Association, and Human Rights Watch. He currently runs a private practice, M Ravi Law.

Early life 
Ravi was born on 9 April 1969, the sixth of seven children, to parents of Tamil descent. His father was a construction worker and one-time thief, while his mother was a housewife. In his memoirs, he describes his father as "too fond of the bottle, and... beatings he rendered to his wife and children". After attending Deyi Secondary School and Anderson Junior College, he graduated from the National University of Singapore with a Bachelors of Arts degree in political science and sociology. He subsequently read a second bachelor's degree in law from Cardiff University.

Legal career

Early career (1996-2006) 
After returning to Singapore, Ravi qualified at the Singapore bar in 1996 and began to practice Singapore law. Initially having a general practice, Ravi was approached by former leader of the opposition J. B. Jeyaretnam in 2003 to defend Vignes Mourthi, an inmate on death row for smuggling heroin into Singapore. The case was Ravi's first capital punishment case and marked a transition into specialising in such cases after six years of practice.

In 2004, Ravi took the case of Public Prosecutor v Shanmugam s/o Murugesu, representing a Singaporean taxi driver who was sentenced to death for smuggling cannabis. After an unsuccessful appeal, Ravi led a public campaign to petition the president of Singapore to pardon Shanmugam, organising events protesting against the death penalty and Shanmugam's execution. The president ultimately did not issue a pardon, and Shanmugam was subsequently hanged. That same year, Ravi represented a number of political protestors in the leading constitutional lawsuit, Chee Siok Chin v Minister for Home Affairs. In 2006, Ravi defended Iwuchukwu Amara Tochi, a Nigerian who was sentenced to death for smuggling drugs into Singapore.

Cause lawyering (2006-2021) 
In 2008, he represented opposition party politician Chee Soon Juan and his sister in a defamation lawsuit waged by prime minister Lee Hsien Loong and his father, former prime minister Lee Kuan Yew. Reuters and the New York Times, in their reporting of the suit, noted that the waging of lawsuits by Singaporean political leaders have been criticised by some as attempts to "cripple opposition politicians". Ravi would later defend other opposition-party politicians in legal challenges, including Roy Ngerng, when sued by Prime Minister Lee Hsien Loong for defamation; Daniel de Costa, who was charged with criminal defamation for op-eds written on members of the Singapore cabinet; and John Tan, who applied for a declaration that his contempt of court conviction did not disqualify him from standing for elections.

In 2011, Ravi launched a constitutional challenge in the High Court of Singapore after his client, Tan Eng Hong, was arrested and charged under section 377A of the penal code, which criminalises gay sex. Tan was charged under s 377A in 2010, despite the Singapore government stating in parliament that they would no longer prosecute citizens under the act. After years of proceedings, the Court of Appeal ruled that 377A was not unconstitutional as it stood. The leading case was nonetheless described by The Guardian as a "milestone in the struggle against Section 377A". In the same year, he represented Alan Shadrake in the leading Singaporean constitutional law case, Shadrake v Attorney-General. Shadrake, a British author who wrote a book on Singapore, was charged and convicted in Singapore for scandalising the jury. Another of Ravi's leading constitutional law cases was that of Vellama d/o Marie Muthu v Attorney-General, which took place after a cleaner sued the Singapore government for not having an election after a member of parliament was expelled from his seat.

From 2009 to 2015, Ravi represented Yong Vui Kong, a then 19-year old Malaysian citizen who was sentenced to death for drug smuggling. The landmark case raised legal issues concerning human rights, including the constitutionality of judicial caning, as well as the reviewability of the clemency process and the exercise of prosecutorial discretion. After six years of hearings, the Singapore government changed the death penalty laws in Singapore. During a re-sentencing trial at the High Court of Singapore, Ravi successfully appealed for Yong to have his death sentence commuted to a lower sentence of life imprisonment with the possibility of parole after twenty years, as well as fifteen strokes of the cane. Ravi later appealed against the caning sentence, arguing that it was unconstitutional, prejudicial, and a form of torture. The Court of Appeal dismissed the appeal, which Ravi described as "[putting Singapore] back to the Middle Ages".

Shortly after, Ravi successfully reopened the case of death row inmate Cheong Chun Yin, who also had his death sentence commuted to life imprisonment and caning (15 strokes) owing to the new law on capital punishment. Ravi later acted for the death row inmates Norasharee Gous (who was later executed in 2022) and Gobi Avedian, who were the second and third cases in Singapore's legal history which the Court of Appeal had agreed to reopen and review. He was successful in Gobi's appeal, which resulted in Gobi's sentence reduced to 15 years' jail and ten strokes of the cane, marking the second time in Singapore's legal history in which a death row inmate was spared on appeal to the Court of Appeal despite the exhaustion of all avenues of appeal.

Private practice and cost orders (2019-Present) 
In 2019, Ravi criticised prosecutors and judges in Singapore for a lack of impartiality. He later apologised and withdrew the statements. The disciplinary tribunal of the Law Society later found that Ravi should be fined at least S$10,000, finding him guilty of two charges of misconduct under the Legal Profession Act.

In October 2020, Ravi alleged that there was a "miscarriage of justice" and that prosecutors had been "overzealous" in their prosecution of Gobi Avedian. A month later, he filed a civil suit on Gobi's behalf against a number of prosecutors, alleging that they had abused their powers and acted in bad faith. The Attorney-General's Chambers disputed Ravi's claims and filed a disciplinary complaint to the Law Society of Singapore for possible professional misconduct. After the Law Society found no misconduct, the Attorney-General's Chambers appealed the decision to the High Court, which affirmed the Society's decision and dismissed the appeal.

On 16 December 2020, Ravi was charged with criminal defamation after he published a post on his Facebook page alleging that Law Minister K. Shanmugam "controls" the Chief Justice of Singapore. On 3 March 2021, the Attorney-General's Chambers issued a warning to Ravi in lieu of continuing the criminal proceedings, after he deleted the post, apologised, and undertook not to repeat the allegations.

On 14 May 2021, the Court of Appeal ordered Ravi to pay S$5,000 to the prosecution after they found that he had acted improperly in making an "unmeritorious" bid to reopen the case of convicted drug trafficker Syed Suhail Syed Zin, whom Ravi had represented pro bono. The court said that Ravi had brought an application without any real basis, misrepresented certain facts in his affidavit, and made baseless allegations against Syed Suhail's former lawyer without giving him a chance to respond. In response, the International Bar Association and International Committee of Jurists later condemned the courts' decision as a "troubling instance where the courts appear to have adopted an overly expansive and impermissible interpretation of what constitutes 'lack of merit'". Former Malaysian Member of Parliament N. Surendran criticised the move, calling the cost order an example of "persecution". The International Committee of Jurists, Amnesty International, and Civicus have described the Singapore government's actions against Ravi as harassment of human rights lawyers.

Since 2019, Ravi has been the founding director of M Ravi Law, a firm with offices across Southeast Asia.

Impact 
As a lawyer, Ravi is known for his aggressive trial advocacy, having been described by Asia Sentinel as "perhaps Singapore's most prominent defense lawyer". The NGO Humans Right Watch has described Ravi's work as having made "Singapore a better, more humane place". Al Jazeera has described Ravi as "perhaps Singapore's most vocal anti-death penalty advocate". Mark Findlay, a professor at the Singapore Management University, describes Ravi as a "respected human rights advocate". George Baylon Radics, a lecturer at the National University of Singapore, writes in the Columbia Human Rights Law Review that "Ravi [is] one of Singapore's most preeminent human rights attorneys... a staunch lawyer for social change." Jothie Rajah, writing in an article published in the Wisconsin International Law Journal, states that:Ravi's impact as a cause lawyer has undoubtedly had some effect on the way the Singapore government has approached death penalty cases... [T]he visibility and presence of Ravi as a cause lawyer, the exception to the Singapore general rule, in some way created the conditions of possibility for other lawyers to step up and play the role of cause lawyer... It may well be that Ravi is the only lawyer in Singapore who can, at the present time, justifiably lay claim to being called a cause lawyer.In 2019, Ravi began representing Nagaenthran K. Dharmalingam, a Malaysian citizen sentenced to death for smuggling drugs into Singapore. On appeal, Ravi argued that Nagaenthran was intellectually disabled, an argument that was dismissed. The case drew the attention of international activists, including Richard Branson, who criticised the court's decision and Singapore's use of the death penalty. Branson's activism led Law Minister K Shanmugam to publicly challenge Branson to a live debate on the death penalty, which Branson declined. In Branson's response, he described Ravi as "courageous".

Activism and political career 
Ravi is an activist for death penalty abolishment and LGBT rights. After an appeal to quash the death penalty of Yong Vui Kong was dismissed by the court of appeal, Ravi lobbied politicians in Malaysia, where Yong is a citizen, and launched an activist movement in Singapore to appeal to the President of Singapore for clemency. Although a petition garnered over 100,000 signatures, the movement did not succeed in obtaining a clemency appeal. When Kho Jabing, a convicted murderer, was sentenced to death in 2016, Ravi applied for a motion in-person to stall the execution in the capacity of an activist, despite not having represented Kho in the case. 

In 2014, he was awarded the Asia Pink Award, an LGBT rights advocacy prize by Element Magazine, for his pro-bono work in challenging the legality of Section 377A.

He stood for election during the 2015 general election, joining a six-member Reform Party team in contesting Ang Mo Kio GRC, but lost to the governing People's Action Party after garnering just 21.36% of the vote.

Personal life 
Ravi was diagnosed with bipolar disorder in 2006, a condition his mother had. He has experienced multiple public manic episodes in the past, including at Hong Lim Park and at places of worship. He has also been temporarily suspended from legal practice on a number of occasions, owing to his medical condition and conduct. Human Rights Watch has recommended the Law Society to ask "the government to promptly extend M. Ravi’s certificate to practice law... [to] ensure that it was acting in line with the Disability Rights Convention."  In 2017, Ravi was ordered to undergo mandatory treatment after he attacked fellow lawyer and opposition party politician Jeannette Chong-Aruldoss, whilst experiencing a manic episode.

In 2014, Ravi wrote an autobiography, Kampong Boy, which was shortlisted for the Singapore Literature Prize.

Notable cases 

 Public Prosecutor v Shanmugam s/o Murugesu (2004)
 Chee Siok Chin v Minister for Home Affairs (2005)
 Public Prosecutor v Iwuchukwu Amara Tochi (2006)
 Lee Kuan Yew v Chee Soon Juan (2008)
 Public Prosecutor v Yong Vui Kong (2009-2015)
 Shadrake v Attorney-General (2011) 
 Ravinthran Ramalingam v Attorney-General (2011) 
 Tan Eng Hong v Attorney-General (2012)
 Kenneth Jeyaretnam v Attorney-General (2013)
 Vellama d/o Marie Muthu v Attorney-General (2013)
 Cheong Chun Yin v Attorney-General (2014)
 James Raj Arokiasamy v Attorney-General (2014)
 Gobi a/l Avedian v Public Prosecutor (2020)
 Iskandar bin Rahmat v Public Prosecutor (2021)
 Public Prosecutor v Nagaenthran A/L K. Dharmalingam (2022)
 Iskandar bin Rahmat v Attorney-General (2022)

Bibliography 
 Land of Good English (2004)
 Hung at Dawn (2005)
 M Ravi: Kampong Boy (2013)
 The Abolition of the Death Penalty in Southeast Asia: The Arduous March Forward in The Universal Periodic Review of Southeast Asia (2017)

References 

1969 births
Living people
Singaporean non-fiction writers
Human rights lawyers
Anti–death penalty activists
Alumni of Cardiff University
20th-century Singaporean lawyers
National University of Singapore alumni
21st-century Singaporean lawyers